The Cotswold Hills League is a cricket league made up of clubs from Warwickshire, Worcestershire and Gloucestershire. 
The spine of the geographic area covered by the League is a picturesque part of England known as The Cotswolds.

The League was founded in 1981 when it consisted of 10 teams whose First XIs played in a single division with a completely separate division for their Second XIs.

Today, the League has grown to 8 divisions of 10 teams drawn from 49 different clubs.

In each division, every team plays each other on a home and away basis competing for promotion or to avoid relegation at the end of the season. Matches are played on Saturdays over 18 weeks, usually commencing with the first Saturday in May. These matches, based on a limited overs one-day format, consist of 90 overs, with the side batting first allowed a maximum of 45 overs. There are restrictions on the maximum number of overs any one bowler can bowl. Points are awarded for a win, plus bonus points for batting and bowling performances.

There is also a Junior Section organised in to 5 different age groups, Under 9, Under 11, Under 13, Under 15 and Under 17. 
The Junior section is open to clubs who do not compete in the senior section.

Member clubs
As of the 2018 season

External links
 Cotswold Hills League website

English domestic cricket competitions